WNBF (1290 AM) is a commercial radio station in Binghamton, New York.  It airs a talk radio format and is owned by Townsquare Media.  The studios and offices are on Court Street in Binghamton.

By day, WNBF is powered at 9,300 watts using a non-directional antenna.  But at night, to protect other stations on AM 1290, it reduces power to 5,000 watts and switches to a three-tower array directional antenna.  The transmitter is off Ingraham Hill Road in Binghamton, among the towers for other broadcast stations in the Binghamton area.

Programming
Weekdays begin with two local shows, First News with Kathy Whyte and James Kelly followed by Binghamton Now with Bob Joseph.  The rest of the weekday schedule is made up of nationally syndicated conservative talk shows:  Brian Kilmeade, Sean Hannity, Mark Levin, John Batchelor and Red Eye Radio. 

Weekend programming includes shows on health, money, car repair, home improvement, a Saturday oldies show and a Sunday morning polka music show.  Syndicated weekend hosts include Kim Komando, Gary Sullivan, Mike Gallagher and Bill Cunningham.  Most hours begin with world and national news from ABC News Radio.

History
WNBF is one of the Southern Tier's oldest radio stations. Although the station has traditionally traced its founding to 1928, the year it moved to Binghamton, it was first licensed on February 7, 1927, to the Howitt-Wood Radio Company (Lyle E. Howitt and H. L. Wood) at 117 West Main Street in Endicott, New York, with 50 watts on 1460 kHz, operating from the Elvin Theater. The WNBF call letters were randomly assigned from a sequential roster of available call signs.

The station was moved to 1450 kHz on June 15, 1927. On November 11, 1928, it was reassigned to 1500 kHz as a low-powered "local" station, as part of a major reallocation implemented by the Federal Radio Commission's General Order 40. Later that month the studios moved to the Arlington Hotel in Binghamton. 

In 1940, the Federal Communications Commission awarded the Howitt-Wood Radio Company one of first construction permits for a commercial FM station. Originally on 44.9 MHz as W49BN, it later became WNBF-FM on 100.5 MHz. The license for this original WNBF-FM was cancelled on August 11, 1952.

In early 1941 station ownership was transferred to the Wylie B. Jones Advertising Agency. On March 29, 1941, most of the stations on 1500 kHz, including WNBF, moved to 1490 kHz, with the implementation of the North American Regional Broadcasting Agreement. In 1942, WNBF moved to 1290 kHz, with a power increase from 250 to 5,000 watts. In 1946, the station owners became Clark Associates, Inc. In 1949 a  transmission tower was constructed for use by both the  AM and FM radio stations, plus a newly authorized television station, WNBF-TV channel 12 (now WBNG-TV). 

In 1955, Triangle Publications purchased WNBF-AM-TV and the construction permit for a new WNBF-FM (now WHWK) on 98.1 MHz, which began broadcasting in 1956. Triangle also owned TV Guide magazine. In 1972, Stoner Broadcasting, based in Des Moines, bought WNBF-AM-FM, and Gateway Communications, publishers of The Record of Bergen County, New Jersey, bought WNBF-TV.  Citadel Broadcasting acquired WNBF and its FM counterpart, WHWK, in 1999.

Over its long history, WNBF has been home to some of the biggest names in area broadcasting. Bill Parker, John Leslie, Roger Neel and Bernard Fionte.

References

External links
 WNBF official website

 FCC History Cards for WNBF (covering 1927-1981)

News and talk radio stations in the United States
NBF
Townsquare Media radio stations
Radio stations established in 1927
1927 establishments in New York (state)